Luraas is a surname. Notable people with the surname include:

Knut Luraas (1782–1843), Norwegian Hardingfele fiddler and artist
Thomas Luraas (1799–1886), Norwegian rose painter and clarinetist, brother of Knut

Surnames of Norwegian origin